The Orange County Board of Supervisors is the five-member governing body of Orange County, California along with being the executive of the county.

Membership
The Board consists of five Supervisors elected by districts to four-year terms by the citizens of Orange County.  The Supervisors represent districts of approximately 600,000 people.

Supervisorial elections take place in June, with run-off elections (if necessary) in November.  Supervisorial terms begin the first Monday after January 1 after the election.  Vacancies on the Board are filled via special election since Orange County voters adopted a county charter in March 2002.  Prior to the adoption of the charter, vacancies on the Board were filled by appointment by the Governor of California.  The December 1996 appointment of Laguna Niguel City Councilman Thomas W. Wilson by Governor Pete Wilson (no relation) was the last time that a gubernatorial appointment was used to fill a supervisorial vacancy (Supervisor Marian Bergeson had resigned to become the California Secretary for Education).  The January 2003 special election of former State Assemblyman Bill Campbell was the first time that a special election was used to fill a supervisorial vacancy (Supervisor Todd Spitzer had resigned after he was elected to the State Assembly to replace the term-limited Campbell).

The current members of the board of supervisors are:
District 1: Andrew Do, Republican, (since February 3, 2015)
District 2: Vicente Sarmiento, Democrat (since January 10, 2023) 
District 3: Donald P. Wagner, Republican (since March 27, 2019)
District 4: Doug Chaffee, Democrat (since January 7, 2019)
District 5: Katrina Foley, Democrat (since March 26, 2021)

Functions
The board makes decisions relating to land use, public utilities, and transportation, both directly and indirectly through its power over budgets and appointments to boards, committees, and commissions. Services that are ultimately managed by the board include regional parks, water, sewers, animal control, buses, freeways, and commuter rail.

Supervisorial Districts

2012–present
The First Supervisorial District consists of the cities of Garden Grove, Santa Ana, and Westminster, the unincorporated community of Midway City, and the northernmost three square miles of the city of Fountain Valley north of Warner Avenue, including Mile Square Regional Park.

The Second Supervisorial District consists of the cities of Costa Mesa, Cypress, Huntington Beach, La Palma, Los Alamitos, Newport Beach, Seal Beach, and Stanton, along with two-thirds of the city of Fountain Valley that are south of Warner Avenue and southwestern portions of the City of Buena Park.  It also includes the unincorporated area of Rossmoor.

The Third Supervisorial District consists of the cities of Orange, Tustin, Villa Park, and Yorba Linda, most of the City of Irvine, as well as the Anaheim Hills area in the city of Anaheim.  It also includes the unincorporated areas of El Modena, MCAS El Toro, Modjeska Canyon, Olive, Orange Park Acres, Santiago Canyon, Silverado, Trabuco Canyon, and Tustin Foothills.

The Fourth Supervisorial District consists of the cities of Brea, Fullerton, La Habra, Placentia, the portions of the city of Anaheim outside of Anaheim Hills, and most of Buena Park.

The Fifth Supervisorial District consists of the cities of Aliso Viejo, Dana Point, Laguna Beach, Laguna Hills, Laguna Niguel, Laguna Woods, Lake Forest, Mission Viejo, Rancho Santa Margarita, San Clemente, and San Juan Capistrano, along with small southwestern portions of the City of Irvine, as well as the unincorporated areas of Coto de Caza, Ladera Ranch, and Las Flores.

2002–2012
The First Supervisorial District consisted of the cities of Santa Ana and Westminster, as well as the eastern half of the city of Garden Grove.

The Second Supervisorial District consisted of the cities of Costa Mesa, Cypress, Fountain Valley, Huntington Beach, La Palma, Los Alamitos, Newport Beach, Seal Beach, and Stanton, as well as the western half of the city of Garden Grove.  It also includes the unincorporated areas of Rossmoor, Sunset Beach, and Surfside.

The Third Supervisorial District consisted of the cities of Brea, Irvine, Orange, Tustin, Villa Park, and Yorba Linda, as well as the Anaheim Hills area in the city of Anaheim.  It also includes the unincorporated areas of El Modena, MCAS El Toro, Modjeska Canyon, Olive, Orange Park Acres, Santiago Canyon, Silverado, Trabuco Canyon, and Tustin Foothills.

The Fourth Supervisorial District consisted of the cities of Buena Park, Fullerton, La Habra, Placentia, as well as the portions of the city of Anaheim outside of Anaheim Hills.

The Fifth Supervisorial District consisted of the cities of Aliso Viejo, Dana Point, Laguna Beach, Laguna Hills, Laguna Niguel, Laguna Woods, Lake Forest, Mission Viejo, Rancho Santa Margarita, San Clemente, San Juan Capistrano, as well as the unincorporated areas of Coto de Caza, Ladera Ranch, and Las Flores.

Special elections
Since voters adopted Measure V, the creation of the county charter, in March 2002, vacancies on the Board of Supervisors have been filled by special election.

January 28, 2003, Third District special election

The first special election used to fill a vacancy on the Orange County Board of Supervisors was held on January 28, 2003.  Third District Supervisor Todd Spitzer had resigned on November 19, 2002, in preparation for taking office as a member of the California State Assembly on December 2 to replace the term-limited Bill Campbell.  Campbell, in turn, easily won the special election to fill the remaining two years of Spitzer's term.

February 6, 2007, First District special election
The second special election used to fill a vacancy on the Orange County Board of Supervisors was held on February 6, 2007.  First District Supervisor Lou Correa had resigned on December 4, 2006, when he took office as a member of the California State Senate to replace the term-limited Joe Dunn.

Garden Grove City Councilwoman Janet Nguyen won the special election to fill the remaining two years of the term by seven votes over Garden Grove Unified School District Boardmember Trung Nguyen (no relation) after a protracted recount battle (ironically, Correa had defeated Assemblywoman Lynn Daucher for the Senate seat after a protracted recount battle, as well).  Both Nguyens had unexpectedly finished ahead of the front-runners, recently retired State Assemblyman Tom Umberg and Santa Ana City Councilman Carlos Bustamante.

June 8, 2010, Fourth District special election
The third special election used to fill a vacancy on the Orange County Board of Supervisors was held on June 8, 2010, and was consolidated with the regular primary election for the next term for the seat.  Fourth District Supervisor Chris Norby had resigned on January 29, 2010, when he took office as a member of the California State Assembly to replace Mike Duvall, who had resigned from the Assembly in the wake of a lobbyist sex scandal.

Fullerton City Councilman Shawn Nelson won the seat by 12% over Anaheim City Councilman Harry Sidhu.  While Nelson won the special election to fill the remaining seven months of Norby's term, the special election was consolidated with the regular primary election, so Nelson and Sidhu advanced to a November run-off election to win the four-year term due to begin in January 2011.  Nelson won the election for the 2011–2015 term by a 63%–37% margin, and would go on to hold the position until January 2019.

January 27, 2015, First District special election
The fourth special election used to fill a vacancy on the Orange County Board of Supervisors was held on January 27, 2015.  First District Supervisor Janet Nguyen had resigned on December 1, 2014, when she took office as a member of the California State Senate to replace the term-limited Lou Correa.  Ironically, Nguyen had been elected as First District Supervisor in a February 6, 2007, special election to replace Correa, who had resigned when he took office as a member of the California State Senate to replace the term-limited Joe Dunn.

Former Garden Grove City Councilman  Andrew Do, Nguyen's supervisorial Chief of Staff, won the special election to fill the remaining two years of the term by 43 votes over Correa.

March 12, 2019, Third District special election

The fifth special election used to fill a vacancy on the Orange County Board of Supervisors was held on March 12, 2019.  Third District Supervisor Todd Spitzer had resigned on January 7, 2019, when he took office as District Attorney of Orange County after defeating incumbent Tony Rackauckas.

Irvine Mayor  Donald P. Wagner won the seat by 5% over former Congresswoman Loretta Sanchez.

March 9, 2021, Second District special election

The sixth special election used to fill a vacancy on the Orange County Board of Supervisors was held on March 9, 2021. Second District Supervisor Michelle Steel had resigned on January 3, 2021, when she took office as a member of the United States House of Representatives after defeating incumbent Harley Rouda. 

Costa Mesa Mayor Katrina Foley won the seat by 12% over former State Senator John Moorlach.

Special districts
Following are the special districts managed by the Orange County Board of Supervisors
 Flood control
 Development agency
 Lighting
 County Service Area
 Sewer Maintenance

Chairs and Vice Chairs
Harriett Wieder became the first woman to serve as Vice Chair in 1980 and as Chair in 1984.  Patricia C. Bates and Janet Nguyen became the first pair of women to serve as Chair and Vice Chair concurrently in 2009.

Gaddi Vasquez became the first Latino to serve as Vice Chair in 1990 and as Chair in 1991.

Janet Nguyen became the first Asian American to serve as Vice Chair in 2009 and Chair in 2010.  Lisa Bartlett and Michelle Steel became the first pair of Asian Americans to serve as Chair and Vice Chair concurrently in 2016.

Supervisors

Notes

External links
Orange County Board of Supervisors

 
Board of Supervisors
County government in California
Politicians from Greater Los Angeles